Brian Lee (born July 5, 1984) is an American former professional ice hockey player. Lee was selected by the Mighty Ducks of Anaheim in the 3rd round (71st overall) of the 2002 NHL Entry Draft.

Amateur career
Lee played major junior hockey with the Erie Otters in the Ontario Hockey League where, from 2000–01 to 2004–05, he played 319 games and collected 25 goals and 82 assists for 107 points, and earned 492 minutes in penalties.

Awards and honors

Career statistics

References

External links

1984 births
Living people
American men's ice hockey defensemen
Chicago Wolves players
Cincinnati Mighty Ducks players
Coventry Blaze players
Diables Rouges de Briançon players
Erie Otters players
Greenville Grrrowl players
Gwinnett Gladiators players
Anaheim Ducks draft picks
Norfolk Admirals players
Stockton Thunder players
People from Berrien Springs, Michigan
Ice hockey players from Michigan